The Rota Romântica is a scenic tourist route that runs through 13 municipalities located in the Serra Gaúcha region of the southernmost Brazilian state of Rio Grande do Sul.  The area was first colonized by German immigrants in the first half of the 19th century, and the strong German influence can still be seen in each of the towns and villages.  The Germanic roots are visible in the architecture, gastronomy and occasionally in the accent and language (Riograndenser Hunsrückisch) of the region.

The Rota Romântica is approximately 184 km (about 114 miles) in distance and extends from São Leopoldo to São Francisco de Paula.  The 13 municipalities along the route are: São Leopoldo, Novo Hamburgo, Estância Velha, Ivoti, Dois Irmãos, Morro Reuter, Santa Maria do Herval, Presidente Lucena, Picada Café, Nova Petrópolis, Gramado, Canela, São Francisco de Paula, and Linha Nova.

The cities of Nova Petrópolis, Gramado, Canela, and São Francisco de Paula are also included in the Região das Hortênsias, one of Brazil's tourist hot spots and very popular throughout the country in the winter and holiday seasons, for its breath-taking scenery, rich European cultural heritage and picturesque architecture.

External links

The Rota Romântica

Tourist attractions in Rio Grande do Sul
Geography of Rio Grande do Sul
Scenic routes